The Ayacucho antpitta (Grallaria ayacuchensis) is a species of bird in the family Grallaridae. It is endemic to the Peruvian department of Ayacucho. The Ayacucho antpitta was formerly believed to be a population of chestnut antpitta, but in 2020 it was described as a new species by Peter A. Hosner, Mark B. Robbins, Morton L. Isler and R. Terry Chesser.

Taxonomy 
The Ayacucho antpitta was described as a new species on the basis of differences in plumage and vocalizations. The birds in the Ayacucho antpitta's range were formerly ascribed to G. blakei.

Both its common name and the specific name, ayacuchensis, come from the department of Ayacucho that contains the species' entire range.

Distribution and habitat 
The Ayacucho antpitta is confined the eastern slope of the Peruvian Andes and to the department of Ayacucho, however it may also appear in parts of neighboring Huancavelica. It is found at elevations of 2,500–3,700 m. It is found west of the Apurímac river and between the Mantaro and Pampas rivers. It inhabits humid montane forests and frequents the understory and forest floor.

It is separated from the closely related Oxapampa antpitta by the Mantaro river, and from the Urubamba antpitta by the Apurímac river.

References 

Birds of Peru
Endemic fauna of Peru
Grallaria